The American as Anarchist: Reflections on Indigenous Radicalism is a history book about the role of Protestantism, capitalism, and American geography in developing American libertarian sentiment.

Reception 
Paul Avrich was disappointed by the book and felt that it covered too much ground with too little specificity. He said it was closer to a "loosely reasoned interpretive essay" than a scholarly monograph, with frequent factual errors and misspelled names. The bibliography, he added, was indiscriminate and too long for the book's scope.

References

Further reading

External links 

 

1978 non-fiction books
Books about anarchism
American history books
History books about the United States
Johns Hopkins University Press books
Books about capitalism
Books about Christianity